Alcorn State University Historic District is a historic district on the campus of Alcorn State University in rural Claiborne County, Mississippi, northwest of Lorman.  It includes Oakland Memorial Chapel, a National Historic Landmark and seven other buildings.

History
Rowan and Martin were two graduates who served as college presidents in the early 1900s and greatly improved the campus.  L. J. Rowan was president from 1905 to 1911 and again from 1915 to 1934. J. A. Martin was president from 1911 to 1915.

Buildings and sites
It includes eight contributing buildings:
Administration Building (1928)
Harmon Hall (1929)
Lanier Hall (1939), Colonial Revival.
Oakland College, Greek Revival:
Belles Lettres ( 1855)
Dormitory No. 2 (c. 1855)
Dormitory No. 3 (c. 1855)
Oakland Chapel (c. 1838)
President's House (c. 1930)

The 1959 Library and Science Building is an intrusion in the district.

References

1982 establishments in Mississippi
Alcorn State University
Geography of Claiborne County, Mississippi
National Register of Historic Places in Claiborne County, Mississippi
Historic districts on the National Register of Historic Places in Mississippi
Protected areas established in 1982